Minerals Separation v. Hyde, 242 U.S. 261 (1916), is a United States Supreme Court case.

Background 
Minerals Separation, Limited obtained U.S. Patent No. 835,120, issued on November 6, 1906, to Henry Livingston Sulman, Hugh Fitzalis Kirkpatrick-Picard and John Ballot.  As stated in the specification of the patent, the claimed discovery related "to improvements in the process for the concentration of ores, the object being to separate metalliferous matter from gangue by means of oils, fatty acids, or other substances which have a preferential affinity for such metalliferous matter over gangue."

Prior to the discovery, it was well known that oil and oily substances had a selective affinity or attraction for, and would unite mechanically with, the minute particles of metal and metallic compounds found in crushed or powdered ores, but would not so unite with the quartz, or rocky nonmetallic material, called "gangue".  It was also well known that this selective property of oils and oily substances was increased when applied to some ores by the addition of a small amount of acid to the ore and water used in process of concentration.

External links
 

United States Supreme Court cases
United States Supreme Court cases of the White Court
United States patent case law
1916 in United States case law